Rabih Mohammad Ataya (born 16 July 1989) is a Lebanese professional footballer who plays as a right winger for  club Ahed and the Lebanon national team.

Starting his career at Tadamon Sour in 2006, Ataya moved to Ansar, where he played for nine seasons. He helped them win a Lebanese FA Cup and a Lebanese Super Cup. In 2016, he moved to Iranian side Zob Ahan; Ataya returned to Lebanon two years later, joining Ahed. He won the 2019 AFC Cup, among other domestic titles. Ataya then moved to Malaysia, on loan to UiTM and Kedah Darul Aman in 2020 and 2021, respectively. He also had a one-match stint at Ajman in the United Arab Emirates.

Having represented Lebanon internationally at youth level, Ataya made his senior debut in 2012. He helped Lebanon qualify for the 2019 AFC Asian Cup, in which he played.

Club career

Early career 
Ataya began his career at hometown club Tadamon Sour in the Lebanese Premier League in 2006. He then moved to Ansar in 2008. On 5 February 2015, Ataya joined Iraqi Premier League club Masafi Al-Wasat for the rest of the season. He remained at Ansar until 2017, scoring 20 league goals, and appearing in the 2013 AFC Cup.

Zob Ahan 

On 16 January 2017, it was announced that Iranian club Zob Ahan had completed the transfer of Ataya. He joined on an 18-month contract for an undisclosed fee, and reunited with fellow Lebanese player Ali Hamam.

Ahed 
On 17 August 2018, Ataya returned to Lebanon, joining reigning champions Ahed in a deal involving Hassan Chaito, Ghazi Honeine, and Hassan Bitar, who moved from Ansar to Ahed.

Loan to UiTM 
On 14 February 2020, Ataya was sent on loan to newly promoted Malaysia Super League club UiTM. He made his debut on 29 February 2020, in a 2–0 defeat to Melaka United. Ataya scored his first goal and made his first assist on 15 March 2020, against PDRM, helping his side win 3–1.

On 26 September 2020, Ataya scored and assisted in a 3–3 draw against Selangor. He finished the season with two goals and two assists in nine games, helping his side reach sixth place in their first season in the top division.

Loan to Kedah Darul Aman 
On 19 November 2020, Ataya moved on loan to league runners-up Kedah Darul Aman for the 2021 season, until November 2021. He made his debut on 5 March 2021, in the opening game of the season – which was also the final of the 2021 Piala Sumbangsih; his team lost 2–0 against Johor Darul Ta'zim.

On 17 and 20 March, Ataya made two assists in two consecutive games, helping his team beat Petaling Jaya City and his former club UiTM. He scored his first goal on 21 August, helping his side win 2–1 against Terengganu. Ataya's second goal came four days later, scoring a long-distance shot off a free kick in a 4–1 win to Petaling Jaya City. He helped Kedah finish in second place, and qualify for the 2022 AFC Cup.

Loan to Ajman 
In January 2022, Ataya moved to UAE Pro League side Ajman on a one-match contract; the nature of the contract is due to the temporary absence of Tunisian midfielder Firas Ben Larbi from Ajman's squad, as he would be competing in the 2021 Africa Cup of Nations. He played the whole 90 minutes in the game against Emirates on 8 January, losing 1–0 at home. He returned to Ahed on 7 February.

International career

Ataya made his senior international debut for Lebanon on 11 May 2012, in a 4–1 friendly defeat to Egypt. He scored his first goal against Jordan on 31 August 2016. On 13 June 2017, Ataya scored his first international brace in a 2019 AFC Asian Cup qualification match, helping Lebanon beat Malaysia 2–1. Ataya was called up for the 2019 AFC Asian Cup; he featured in two games, against Saudi Arabia and North Korea.

Style of play 
Ataya's main qualities are his dribbling and technical ability, alongside his finishing and crossing. He has been likened to Algerian player Riyad Mahrez for his skilful play.

Career statistics

International

Scores and results list Lebanon's goal tally first, score column indicates score after each Ataya goal.

Honours 
Ansar
 Lebanese FA Cup: 2011–12
 Lebanese Super Cup: 2012

Ahed
 AFC Cup: 2019
 Lebanese Premier League: 2018–19, 2021–22
 Lebanese FA Cup: 2018–19
 Lebanese Elite Cup: 2022
 Lebanese Super Cup: 2018, 2019

Kedah Darul Aman
 Piala Sumbangsih runner-up: 2021

Individual
 Lebanese Premier League Team of the Season: 2015–16
 Lebanese Premier League Best Goal: 2018–19

See also 
 List of Lebanon international footballers

References

External links 

 
 
 
 
 
 

1989 births
Living people
People from Tyre, Lebanon
Lebanese footballers
Association football wingers
Tadamon Sour SC players
Al Ansar FC players
Masafi Al-Wasat players
Zob Ahan Esfahan F.C. players
Al Ahed FC players
UiTM FC players
Kedah Darul Aman F.C. players
Ajman Club players
Lebanese Premier League players
Iraqi Premier League players
Persian Gulf Pro League players
Malaysia Super League players
UAE Pro League players
Lebanon youth international footballers
Lebanon international footballers
2019 AFC Asian Cup players
AFC Cup winning players
Lebanese expatriate footballers
Lebanese expatriate sportspeople in Iraq
Lebanese expatriate sportspeople in Iran
Lebanese expatriate sportspeople in Malaysia
Lebanese expatriate sportspeople in the United Arab Emirates
Expatriate footballers in Iraq
Expatriate footballers in Iran
Expatriate footballers in Malaysia
Expatriate footballers in the United Arab Emirates